Mabadin may refer to:
 Mabadin-e Olya
 Mabadin-e Sofla